Adrian Andrei Rusu (born 8 November 1951) is a researcher in Romanian medieval archaeology. He is also a researcher at the Institute of Archaeology and Art History in Cluj-Napoca.

Born in Mediaș, he attended elementary school and high school in his native city, after which he studied at the University of Cluj, graduating in 1974. From 1974 to 1988 he worked at the Central University Library of Cluj-Napoca and in 1990 he joined the faculty of Babeș-Bolyai University. He is a principal researcher at the  site in Frumușeni, Arad County.

Publications

See also
 Frumușeni Mosaics

References

1951 births
Living people
People from Mediaș
Romanian archaeologists
Romanian art historians
Babeș-Bolyai University alumni
Academic staff of Babeș-Bolyai University